The La France was a French Army non-rigid airship launched by Charles Renard and Arthur Constantin Krebs on August 9, 1884. Collaborating with Charles Renard, Arthur Constantin Krebs piloted the first fully controlled free-flight with the La France. It was the first full round trip flight with a landing on the starting point. On its seven flights in 1884 and 1885 the La France dirigible returned five times to its starting point.

Hangar

The La France was constructed in Hangar "Y" at Chalais-Meudon near Paris in 1879. Hangar "Y" is one of the few remaining airship hangars in Europe.

Specifications

See also
Timeline of hydrogen technologies

References

External links 

 
 
 
 

19th-century French experimental aircraft
Airships of France
Aviation history of France
Electric aircraft
Hydrogen airships